Columbia Publications was an American publisher of pulp magazines featuring the genres of science fiction, westerns, detective stories, romance, and sports fiction. The company published such writers as Isaac Asimov, Louis L'Amour, Arthur C. Clarke, Randall Garrett, Edward D. Hoch, and William Tenn; Robert A. W. Lowndes was an important early editor for such writers as Carol Emshwiller, Edward D. Hoch and Kate Wilhelm.

Operating from the mid-1930s to 1960, Columbia's most notable magazines were the science fiction pulps Future Science Fiction, Science Fiction, and Science Fiction Quarterly. Other long-running titles included Double Action Western Magazine, Real Western, Western Action, Famous Western, Today's Love Stories, Super Sports, and Double Action Detective and Mystery Stories. In addition to pulp magazines, the company also published some paperback novels, primarily in the science fiction genre.

Columbia Publications was the most prolific of a number of pulp imprints operated in the 1930s by Louis Silberkleit. Nominally, their offices were in Springfield, Massachusetts and Holyoke, Massachusetts (the addresses of their printers, binders, and mailers for subscriptions), but they were actually produced out of 60 Hudson Street in New York City.

History 
Louis Silberkleit and Maurice Coyne (two out of three of the men who later founded MLJ Magazines (Archie Comic Publications)) started publishing pulps in Sept. 1934 with the publisher brand Winford Publications and the title Double Action Western Magazine, soon joined by Real Western. The two men launched the Northwest Publishing imprint in 1935, Chesterfield Publications in 1936, Blue Ribbon Magazines in 1937, and Double Action Magazines in 1938. Silberkleit ran the companies while Coyne acted as a silent partner and business manager.

Meanwhile, Silberkleit and Coyne had started Columbia Publications in late 1937. Columbia's first titles were Western pulps: Western Yarns debuted in January 1938 and Complete Cowboy in January 1939. Beginning with the June 1940 issue, Columbia took over publication of  Western Action from Winford Publications. The same happened in November 1940 with Double Action Western Magazine and Real Western.

Editor Charles Hornig was hired in October 1938. He had no office; he worked from home, coming into the office as needed to drop off manuscripts and dummy materials, and pick up typeset materials to proof. He was given broad freedom to select what he wanted to publish; he reported to Silberkleit's chief editor, Abner J. Sundell.

In 1941, Silberkleit essentially consolidated all his pulp publishing companies under the Columbia Publications umbrella. Extant titles Columbia took on that year included Famous Western, Science Fiction, Hooded Detective (started in 1938 under a different title), Future Fiction, Sports Winners and Super Sports. At that point, in mid-1941, Robert A. W. Lowndes came on board, becoming Columbia's lead editor. In late 1941, Silberkleit merged Science Fiction with Future Fiction.

Two years later Columbia cancelled both Future and Science Fiction Quarterly (launched in 1941), deciding to use the limited paper they could acquire for their line of Western and detective titles instead. (The U.S.'s 1941–1942 entry into World War II brought about a paper shortage, which equally effected other pulp publications.) Both magazines, as well as Science Fiction, were revived in the 1950s.

In addition to pulp magazines, Columbia published a few paperback books, most notably Noel Loomis' City of Glass (1955) (a "Double Action Pocketbook"; originally published in 1942 as a shorter piece in Standard Magazines' Startling Stories) and the five-issue series Science Fiction Classics (1942), which included novellas by Earl Binder and Otto Binder writing as "John Coleridge," and John Russell Fearn writing as "Dennis Clive".

As television supplanted magazines as the dominant form of mass entertainment in the 1950s, the pulps suffered from slumping sales. In February 1960, when Columbia's distributor refused to carry any more of the company's titles, that signaled the end of Columbia Publications.

Silberkleit, Coyne, and fellow Archie founder John L. Goldwater immediately founded Belmont Books, a low-rent paperback publisher devoted to science fiction, horror, and mystery titles.
In its early years, Belmont published a number of science fiction anthologies that featured content from Science Fiction, Future Fiction, Science Fiction Quarterly, and Dynamic Science Fiction, all of which had been published by Columbia Publications.

Gerald G. Swan reprints 
British publisher Gerald G. Swan (1902–1980) published 16 issues of Swan American Magazine from 1946 to 1950, the contents of which were culled from Columbia Publications titles. The Swan issues focused on Western and detective titles, with a couple of science fiction-themed issues thrown in. Five individual issues of Swan American Magazine were devoted to material reprinted from Columbia's Famous Western, two to Western Yarns, and two to Complete Cowboy.

Swan American Magazines issues:
 Western Yarns (1948)
 Detective Yarns (1948)
 Crack Detective Stories (1948)
 Famous Western (1948)
 Western Yarns (1948)
 Famous Western (1948
 Hooded Detective (1948)
 Famous Western (1948)
 Crack Detective (1948)
 Famous Western (1948)
  Future Fantasy and Science Fiction (1948)
 Complete Cowboy Wild Western Stories
 Famous Western
 Complete Cowboy Wild Western Stories
 Science Fiction Quarterly (1950)
  Black Hood Detective (1950)

In 1960, Swan also published three issues of Weird and Occult Library, which mostly featured old stories from Columbia's science fiction pulps.

Titles published

Further reading 
 Lowndes, Robert A. W. "The Columbia Pulps," The Pulp Era No. 67 (May–August 1967), edited by Lynn A. Hickman

Notes

References

Notes

Sources consulted 
 Pulp Magazines, Galactic Central website

 
American companies established in 1937
American companies disestablished in 1960
Publishing companies established in 1937
Magazine publishing companies of the United States
Pulp magazine publishing companies of the United States
1937 establishments in New York (state)
1937 establishments in Massachusetts
1960 disestablishments in Massachusetts
1960 disestablishments in New York (state)
Defunct companies based in Massachusetts